Hasanabad-e Belher (also Romanized as Ḩasanābād-e Belher) is a village in Belharat Rural District, Miyan Jolgeh District, Nishapur County, Razavi Khorasan Province, Iran. At the 2006 census, its population was 751, in 209 families.

References 

Populated places in Nishapur County